This is a list of films that won awards at the American 48 Hour Film Festival.


2001 

No awards were given for the festival's inaugural year.

2002 

The winners of the 2002 48 Hour Film Project were announced at Filmapalooza 2003, held at Goethe-Institut Washington in Washington, DC, in February 2003.

Best Film - "White Bitch Down" by Boondogglers  Atlanta, Georgia 
Runner Up for Best Film: "Child Prodigies: Where Are They Now?" by Team Feckless  Philadelphia, Pennsylvania

Source:

2003 

The winners of the 2003 48 Hour Film Project were announced at Filmapalooza 2004, held at the SXSW Film Festival in Austin, Texas, on March 13, 2004.

Best Film - "Baggage" by Slapdash Films  Los Angeles, California 
First Runner Up for Best Film - "The Face: The Movie" by Cake  Philadelphia, Pennsylvania 
Second Runner Up for Best Film - "Special Crime Unit" by Lazy Racer  Auckland, New Zealand

Source:

2004 

The winners of the 2004 48 Hour Film Project were announced at Filmapalooza 2005, held at the Cinequest Film Festival in San Jose, California, on March 12, 2005.

Best Film - "Moved" by Nice Hat Productions  Atlanta, Georgia 
Runner Up for Best Film: "AndyMan" by Faceworker/Rupert Road  Sheffield, England

Source:

2005 

The winners of the 2005 48 Hour Film Project were announced at Filmapalooza 2006, held at the Anno Domini in San Jose, California, on March 11, 2006.

Best Film - "Mimes on the Prairie" by Team Last to Enter  Des Moines, Iowa 
First Runner Up for Best Film: "The Write Stuff" by ScatterShot  San Francisco, California
Second Runner Up for Best Film: "Les Champignons de Paname" ("The Mushrooms of Paris") by Blue Turtles from Paris  Paris, France
Best Film from the Panasonic HD Filmmakers Showdown: "Multiverse" by WIT Films  Washington, DC. The grand prize was an HVX200 HD camera.

Source:

2006 

The winners of the 2006 48 Hour Film Project were announced at Filmapalooza 2007, held at Sauce in Albuquerque, New Mexico, on March 10, 2007.

Best Film - "Tooth and Nail" by Cinema Syndicate  Portland, Oregon
First Runner Up for Best Film - "Manquer" by Milk  Seattle, Washington 
Second Runner Up for Best Film - "Maten al Payaso" by Afafas  Miami, Florida
Best Directing - "Caramba!" by Artnum  Paris, France
Best Acting - "Doughboy, Beware" by Biscuits and Gravy  Los Angeles, California
Best Script - "Tooth and Nail" by Cinema Syndicate  Portland, Oregon 
Best Cinematography - "Manquer" by Milk  Seattle, Washington
Best Editing - "Stairwell C" by Vaughn Juares  Minneapolis, Minnesota
Best Film from the Fall Shootout - "Tipparinos" by Vaughn Juares  Minneapolis, Minnesota
Best Film from the Panasonic HD Filmmaker Showdown - "Maestro" by Bargain Basement Films  Baltimore, Maryland

Source:

2007 

The winners of the 2007 48 Hour Film Project were announced at Filmapalooza 2008, held at Camera 12 in San Jose, California, on March 2, 2008.

Best Film - "TimeCatcher" by No Budget Productions  Tel Aviv, Israel
First Runner Up for Best Film - "Dòn" by La Lumiere Soudaine  Rome, Italy
Second Runner Up for Best Film - "Sweetie" by Trifecta+ Entertainment  Albuquerque, New Mexico
Best Directing - "TimeCatcher" by No Budget Productions  Tel Aviv, Israel
Best Acting - "Dòn" by La Lumiere Soudaine  Rome, Italy and "Sweetie" by Trifecta+ Entertainment  Albuquerque, New Mexico (tie)
Best Script - "TimeCatcher" by No Budget Productions  Tel Aviv, Israel
Best Cinematography - "Room 303" by Team KC  Amsterdam, Netherlands
Best Editing - "TimeCatcher" by No Budget Productions  Tel Aviv, Israel
Best Film from the Panasonic HD Filmmaker Showdown - "Lizzie Strata" by Integral Arts  Washington, DC

Source:

2008 

The winners of the 2008 48 Hour Film Project were announced at Filmapalooza 2009, held at the Tower Theater in Miami, Florida, on March 14, 2009.

Best Film - "Transfert" by FatCat Films  Paris, France
First Runner Up for Best Film - "An Old Scam" by Ha'amoraim  Tel Aviv, Israel
Second Runner Up for Best Film - "Aidan 5" by Jakson  Columbus, Ohio
Honorable Mention for Best Film: "Backwoods" by Studio Bib Simmons  Milwaukee, Wisconsin
Best Directing - "An Old Scam" by Ha'amoraim  Tel Aviv, Israel
Best Acting - "An Old Scam" by Ha'amoraim  Tel Aviv, Israel
Best Screenplay - "An Old Scam" by Ha'amoraim  Tel Aviv, Israel
Best Cinematography - "Transfert" by FatCat Films  Paris, France
Best Editing - "An Old Scam" by Ha'amoraim  Tel Aviv, Israel
Best Film from the International Shootout - "Buying Time" by Half Baked  Melbourne, Australia. The grand prize was $1,000. 
Runner Up for Best Film from the International Shootout  - "A Darling Time in Vegas" by Vegaswood  Las Vegas, Nevada
Second Runner Up for Best Film from the International Shootout - "Go Human" by Par-t-com Productions  Los Angeles, California
Best Film from the Panasonic HD Filmmaker Showdown - "Quillions" by More Where That Came From  Denver, Colorado. The grand prize was a Panasonic HPX170 HD camera.

Source:

2009 

The winners of the 2009 48 Hour Film Project were announced at Filmapalooza 2010, held at the Las Vegas Hilton in Las Vegas, Nevada, on April 12, 2010. The grand prize for "Best Film" was $3,000.

Best Film - "Nicht nur der Himmel ist blau" by Sharktankcleaners  Berlin, Germany
Runner Up for Best Film - "The Grave Review" by Rascallion Media Group  Minneapolis, Minnesota 
Second Runner Up for Best Film - "Rationed" by Vegan Cannibal Productions  Inland Empire, California
Best Directing - "Regenmakers" by Stichting DuS  Breda, Netherlands 
Best Writing - "Geen zin" by Zin in een film.nl  Utrecht, Netherlands
Honorable Mention for Best Writing - "Don't Forget the Milk" by Wax Idiotical Films  Providence, Rhode Island 
Best Acting - "11" by Blind Mice  Athens, Greece 
Best Cinematography - "Piccadilly High Noon" by Liminal  London, England
Best Editing - "Ehsaas" by Time Travel  Mumbai, India
Best Special Effects - "Gwendolyn Dangerous and the Great Space Rescue" by Integral Arts  Washington, D.C.
Best Film from the International Shootout - "Prebloc" by Bande a part  Paris, France 
Best Film from the Panasonic HD Filmmaker Showdown - "Who's the Fairest" by Rascallion Media Group  Minneapolis, Minnesota. The grand prize was a Panasonic HD camera.

Source:

2010 

The winners of the 2010 48 Hour Film Project were announced at Filmapalooza 2011, held at the Tower Theater in Miami, Florida, on March 12, 2011. The grand prize for "Best Film" was $3,000.

Best Film - "The Girl Is Mime" by Far From Home  London, England.
First Runner Up for Best Film - "46 Miles" by Cinema Geeks  Denver, Colorado
Second Runner Up for Best Film - "Casting Call" by Evolve Productions  Los Angeles, California
Best Directing - "The Girl Is Mime" by Far From Home  London, England 
Honorable Mention for Directing - "Gesti" by Gadoev  Rome, Italy
Best Writing - "46 Miles" by Cinema Geeks  Denver, Colorado
Honorable Mention for Writing - "Casting Call" by Evolve Productions  Los Angeles, California
Best Acting - "Casting Call" by Evolve Productions  Los Angeles, California
Honorable Mention for Acting - "The Girl Is Mime" by Far From Home  London, England
Best Cinematography - "The Girl Is Mime" by Far From Home  London, England
Honorable Mention for Cinematography - "Gesti" by Gadoev  Rome, Italy
Best Editing - "Gesti" by Gadoev  Rome, Italy
Honorable Mention for Editing - "Casting Call" by Evolve Productions  Los Angeles, California

Source:

2011 

The winners of the 2011 48 Hour Film Project were announced at Filmapalooza 2012, held at the Taos Center for the Arts in Taos, New Mexico, on March 4, 2012. The grand prize for "Best Film" was $3,000.

Best Film - "In Captivity" by Jpixx Films  Hampton Roads, Virginia
Runner Up for Best Film - "My Darling, I'm So Sorry" by so36portraits  Berlin, Germany 
Second Runner Up for Best Film - "Canh Ba Ba" by Yeti  Ho Chi Minh City, Vietnam
Best Directing - "My Darling, I'm So Sorry" by so36portraits  Berlin, Germany
Honorable Mention for Directing - "In Captivity" by Jpixx Films  Hampton Roads, Virginia
Best Writing - "My Darling, I'm So Sorry" by so36portraits  Berlin, Germany
Honorable Mention for Writing - "Canh Ba Ba" by Yeti  Ho Chi Minh City, Vietnam
Best Acting (Ensemble) - "Casse gueule" by Collectif 109  Paris, France
Best Acting (Individual) - Jason Perini in "A Little Bit Behind" by The Magnificent  New South Wales, Australia
Best Cinematography - "Page 23" by Arts, Houben & Van Den Boogaard  Utrecht, Netherlands
Best Editing - "In Captivity" by Jpixx Films  Hampton Roads, Virginia
Best Use of Line - "My Darling, I'm So Sorry" by so36portraits  Berlin, Germany
Best Special Effects - "In Captivity" by Jpixx Films  Hampton Roads, Virginia
Best Song - "Oh Drama" by White Poison Industries  Des Moines, Iowa
Best Graphics - "Page 23" by Arts, Houben & Van Den Boogaard  Utrecht, Netherlands

Source:

2012 

The winners of the 2012 48 Hour Film Project were announced at Filmapalooza 2013, held at the TCL Chinese Theatre in Hollywood, California, on March 10, 2013.

Best Film - "Jacques Serres" by Les Productions avec Volontiers - directors François Goetghebeur & Nicolas Lebrun  Paris, France 
First Runner Up for Best Film - "Les Dernières Marches" by Les Loups blancs  Lyon, France 
Second Runner Up for Best Film - "Past.Tense" by Bench Films  Cape Town, South Africa
Best Directing - "Jacques Serres" by Les Productions avec Volontiers - directors François Goetghebeur & Nicolas Lebrun  Paris, France
Best Writing - "Jacques Serres" by Les Productions avec Volontiers - directors François Goetghebeur & Nicolas Lebrun  Paris, France
Best Cinematography - "Les Dernières Marches" by Les Loups blancs  Lyon, France and "Jacques Serres" by Les Productions avec Volontiers - directors François Goetghebeur & Nicolas Lebrun  Paris, France (tie)
Best Acting (Ensemble) - "Sorry" by Jeroen Houben  Rotterdam, Netherlands
Best Acting (Female Lead) - Katerina Pindejovà in "Main Course" by Laska  Prague, Czech Republic 
Best Acting (Male Lead) - Doug Powell in "Welcome to the Neighborhood" by Star Wipe Films  Baltimore, Maryland
Best Choreography - "The Crossing" by B & C  Los Angeles, California
Best Graphics - "Eleven 0 One" by Stranger Studios  Denver, Colorado
Best Sound Design - "Advancing Age" by The Big Honkin'  Washington, DC 
Best Musical - "GoodNewsBurningFire: The Musical" by Little Earth Productions  Dundee, Scotland
Best Editing - "Les Dernières Marches" by Les Loups blancs  Lyon, France 
Best Special Effects - "Until Death" by Flip Eleven Creative  Milwaukee, Wisconsin 
Best Use of Line - "Where Sheep May Safely Graze" by Trinidad Mustache Films  Albuquerque, New Mexico 
Best Use of Prop - "The Pillow-Case" by Guerilla Film Crew  Dubai, UAE and "Main Course" by Laska  Prague, Czech Republic
Best Use of Character - "Welcome to the Neighborhood" by Star Wipe Films  Baltimore, Maryland 
Best Music Video - "Past Scenes" by Facades with Woow Your Life  Paris, France
Best Song - "Shut the Door" by Songs of Aran with FMV  Nijmegen, Netherlands

Source:

References

External links 

48 Hour Film Project